Tomasz Górski (born 15 August 1973 in Poznań) is a Polish politician. He was elected to the Sejm on 25 September 2005, getting 8664 votes in 39 Poznań district as a candidate from the Law and Justice list.

On 4 November 2011 he, along with 15 other supporters of the dismissed PiS MEP Zbigniew Ziobro, left Law and Justice on ideological grounds to form a breakaway group, United Poland.

See also
Members of Polish Sejm 2005-2007

References

External links
Tomasz Górski - parliamentary page - includes declarations of interest, voting record, and transcripts of speeches.

1973 births
Living people
Politicians from Poznań
Members of the Polish Sejm 2005–2007
United Poland politicians
Members of the Polish Sejm 2007–2011
Members of the Polish Sejm 2011–2015